The Knappe Tunnel is a four-lane, twin-tube motorway tunnel in the city-municipality of Bergen in Vestland county, Norway. The tunnel is part of County Road 557 and consists of the first and second stages of the four-lane motorway project called Ring Road West. The southern part of the tunnel goes under the Nordåsstraumen, a small strait connecting the lake Nordåsvatnet and the Grimstadfjorden.

The tunnel was built in two stages.  The first stage, from Dolvik in Søreidgrenda to Sandeide (with a branch heading east to Straume), started in August 2006 and was opened to the public on 10 September 2010. Stage two will run from Sandeide to the southern tip of the lake Liavatnet, where it will intersect with National Road 555.  There are two extra exits/entrances to the tunnel (other than the two endpoints of the tunnel).  There is a branch that heads east off the main path of the tunnel to connect to the village of Straume, and another branch that connects to the village of Sandeidet/Varden.

The second segment is scheduled for completion in 2015.

References

Subsea tunnels in Norway
Road tunnels in Bergen
2010 establishments in Norway
Tunnels completed in 2010